The 2010–2011 St. Francis Terriers men's basketball team represented St. Francis College during the 2010–11 NCAA Division I men's basketball season. The team was coached by Glenn Braica who was in his first year at the helm of the Terriers. The Terriers' home games were played at Generoso Pope Athletic Complex and the team is a member of the Northeast Conference.

In Glenn Braica's first year as head coach, the Terriers finished 15–15 (10–8 in the NEC). The Terriers made the playoffs as the 5th seed and lost in the quarter-finals to Central Connecticut State University. The Terriers were off to a good start, yet, after the Madison Square Garden Holiday Festival, which included losses to Northwestern University and Davidson College, they seemed to falter. The Terriers hit their low when losing two straight to Long Island University, including the Battle of Brooklyn game at home. After those loses, the Terriers picked themselves up and finished the regular season strong winning their last four games against conference teams.

Under Braica, the Terriers increased their scoring by more than six points per game from the previous season and were one of the best teams in the country in taking care of the basketball, averaging a conference-low 13.3 turnovers per game. The team also led the NEC with 7.80 steals per game.

Preseason
Braica was busy signing his first class, which include: 6' guard Dre Calloway, 6' 4" guard/forward Travis Nichols, 6' guard Adam Chmielewski,  6' 8" power forward Matt Milk, and 6' 2" shooting guard Ben Mockford.

Schedule and results

|-
!colspan=12 style=| Regular season

|-
!colspan=12 style=| NEC tournament

Roster

Notes
Akeem Bennett and Ricky Cadell were named to the Second Team All-Conference Squad. In addition, Bennett was named the Northeast Conference Defensive Player of the Year. For Cadell, in the last game of the regular season he became St. Francis College's all-time leading scorer. With 1,624 points he eclipsed Darwin Purdie’s school record that had stood for over 20 years and now ranks 35th on the NEC career scoring list.

References

External links
 St. Francis Terriers men's basketball official website

St. Francis Brooklyn Terriers men's basketball seasons
St. Francis
2010 in sports in New York City
2011 in sports in New York City